Ctenoplectra is a genus of bees belonging to the family Apidae.

The species of this genus are found in Africa and Malesia.

Species:

Ctenoplectra albolimbata 
Ctenoplectra alluaudi 
Ctenoplectra antinorii 
Ctenoplectra armata 
Ctenoplectra australica 
Ctenoplectra bequaerti 
Ctenoplectra chalybea 
Ctenoplectra cornuta 
Ctenoplectra davidi 
Ctenoplectra elsei 
Ctenoplectra florisomnis 
Ctenoplectra paolii 
Ctenoplectra polita 
Ctenoplectra politula 
Ctenoplectra sandakana 
Ctenoplectra terminalis 
Ctenoplectra thladianthae 
Ctenoplectra ugandica 
Ctenoplectra vagans 
Ctenoplectra yoshikawai

References

Apidae